Bernard Richard Braine, Baron Braine of Wheatley, PC (24 June 1914 – 5 January 2000) was a Conservative Party politician in the United Kingdom. He was a Member of Parliament (MP) for 42 years, from 1950 to 1992, representing constituencies in Essex.

Early life
He was educated at Hendon County Grammar School, and served with the North Staffordshire Regiment in the Second World War, rising to the rank of Lieutenant-Colonel.

Political career
In 1948, Braine opposed GATT, arguing that it limited imperial preference.

Having stood unsuccessfully for Leyton East in 1945, Braine was elected as MP for Billericay at the 1950 general election. When constituency boundaries were revised for the 1955 election he was returned for the new South East Essex constituency, and when that constituency was abolished for the 1983 general election, he was elected for the new  Castle Point constituency, becoming Father of the House of Commons in 1987 after James Callaghan's elevation to the House of Lords.

During his long parliamentary career, Braine served as a junior Minister variously for Pensions, Commonwealth Relations and Health.

He was chairman of the National Council on Alcoholism, and author of the report Alcohol and Work (1977), widely known as the Braine Report. He was a member of the Parliamentary Groups on Human Rights and against abortion. For many years he served as an unofficial ambassador of HM's government to the Polish Government-in-Exile in London. He was knighted in the 1972 New Year Honours, and appointed as a Privy Counsellor in 1985.

Braine championed many causes involving oppressed people. Among them was the Campaign for the Defence of the Unjustly Prosecuted, of which he was President and later Chairman during 1980-1987. In this capacity and in collaboration with the exiled journalist Josef Josten, he campaigned vigorously for the release from prison of the dissident playwright Vaclav Havel, who later became President of the Czech Republic. He was decorated by Havel at a ceremony in Prague Castle on 28 October 1995.

Later life
Braine stepped down from Parliament at the 1992 general election, and on 10 August that year he was made a life peer as Baron Braine of Wheatley, of Rayleigh in the County of Essex. He died in January 2000 at the age of 85.

Arms

References

External links 
 

Parliamentary Archives, The papers of Baron Braine of Wheatley, 1947-1994

1914 births
2000 deaths
Military personnel from Middlesex
British Army personnel of World War II
Conservative Party (UK) MPs for English constituencies
Braine of Wheatley
Knights Bachelor
Members of the Parliament of the United Kingdom for South East Essex
Members of the Privy Council of the United Kingdom
Ministers in the Macmillan and Douglas-Home governments, 1957–1964
North Staffordshire Regiment officers
People from Rayleigh, Essex
Politicians awarded knighthoods
Recipients of the Order of Tomáš Garrigue Masaryk
UK MPs 1950–1951
UK MPs 1951–1955
UK MPs 1955–1959
UK MPs 1959–1964
UK MPs 1964–1966
UK MPs 1966–1970
UK MPs 1970–1974
UK MPs 1974
UK MPs 1974–1979
UK MPs 1979–1983
UK MPs 1983–1987
UK MPs 1987–1992
Grand Commanders of the Order of Honour (Greece)
Life peers created by Elizabeth II